Needle (also known as Black Magic) is a 2010 Australian independent supernatural horror film starring Michael Dorman, Jessica Marais, Travis Fimmel, Trilby Glover, and Ben Mendelsohn, and directed by John V. Soto. Needle is structured as a murder mystery, with six distinct clues pointing to one of ten suspects; the trailer is intentionally misleading.

Release and distribution 
The film premiered at Cinefest OZ in August 2010, and has since screened at the British Horror Film Festival and Screamfest Horror Film Festival; as well as the Melbourne Underground Film Festival. Needle had a limited eight-screen release in Australian cinemas on 28 July 2011. The film also had a successful release in Turkey on 29 July 2011 where it opened at No.4 at the box office on 62 screens. Needle played for 13 weeks eventually grossing US$259,185. At 1 September 2012, Needle has been sold in 82 countries worldwide with rights for major territories going to Lionsgate (USA), High Fliers (UK), Telepool (Germany), Playarte (Brazil), SND (France), Shochiku (Japan) and Sony (Australia)  Needle was made for $3m and filmed over six weeks in Perth, Western Australia. Needle had its Australian TV Premiere on Saturday 12 December 2015 on Channel ONE (Network TEN). 

Director John V. Soto credits influences from such horror and mystery films as Hellraiser, Urban Legend, and I Know What You Did Last Summer.

Plot 

Ten years ago, a man on a phone call is killed gruesomely by someone after the person at the other end of the line accused him of stealing an important archaeological artifact. A woman and a child, presumed to be the murdered man's family comes rushing in to his aid.

Present time, at St. Mary's College, Ben Rutherford (Michael Dorman), a college student, inherits a strange looking mechanical box called Le Vaudou Mort from his father, who had died two years earlier. That night, he decides to show the box to his best friend Ryan (Nathaniel Buzolic), a girl, Mary (Tahyna Tozzi), who has romantic feelings for Ben, lesbian couple Kandi (Jessica Marais) and Isabel (Trilby Glover) and two other friends Nelson, a school paper photographer (Luke Carroll) and Jed (Khan Chittenden). 

Before leaving, Nelson takes a group photo. Morning comes and Nelson wants to photograph the mechanical box to advertise it, thinking it must be worth a great fortune. Ben reluctantly agrees but to his dismay, the box has gone missing. Ben asks Mary if she "borrowed" it (because they were the last two to see the box), but Mary denies his allegations. Nelson and Ryan decide to ask their Archaeology professor, Professor Banyon (Jane Badler), about the box. She reveals that it was used as a theatre prop and nothing else, but will alert them if she has any information. That night, during a run through school, an unknown person is seen cutting out Ryan's face from the picture Nelson took and then inserting it into the Le Vaudou Mort indicating that it was actually stolen by someone. 

Suddenly, the lights around the school start exploding, frightening Ryan, who runs out of the school into the woods. The unknown person then pulled out a wax figure from the Le Vaudou Mort resembling Ryan and started slashing the figure with heated up needles. Ryan, in reality started to bleed to death when gushes appeared on his body. When the police found his body the next day, Ben's brother Marcus (Travis Fimmel), (who he is not in good terms with because Ben blamed him for their father's death two years ago due to a car crash after their misunderstanding), was the crime scene photographer and immediately recognized Ryan. He went to tell Ben about it. The next night, Nelson, who was still affected by Ryan's death, went wall climbing. The unknown person then cut Nelson's face from the photo and inserted it in the Le Vaudou Mort. Nelson's wax figure came out and the unknown person started to rip out the limbs. In reality, Nelson was killed when he was dismembered gruesomely. Ben found out about Nelson. Mary and Kandi decided to have a wake in Isabel's house for their friends. Before Ben went, he was called by Professor Banyon and was introduced to another Archaeology expert Dr. Halmanay (Igor Sas) and told him that the Le Vaudou Mort was in fact a revenge apparatus. At the wake, Kandi was having a breakdown so they decided to leave. Suddenly, Professor Banyon called Ben saying it was urgent and he needed to go. Marcus and Ben went to discover more about the Le Vaudou Mort. Kandi decided to pick up some drinks and drop Mary home and Jed went to the game house. Alone at the house, Isabel went to swim when the unknown person decided to victimize her next, doing the exact thing as with the others. The killer then stabbed needles in the figure's eyes, killing Isabel in reality. Marcus and Ben went to Professor Banyon's office only to find her dead with her head beaten severely. Having finished their research, they found out that their father, Samuel Rutherford (James Hagan) stole the Le Vaudou Mort from his friend Robert Shaw (Michael Loney) ten years ago. The two brothers then concluded that whoever the person doing the killing was, wanted revenge on their father, thus passing the revenge in his sons and their friends. They headed back to Isabel's house to warn their friends only to find her body. Kandi, who was driving back home and seemingly was able to drop off Mary, came upon Jed. She decided to give him a ride too. Marcus and Ben went to their old neighborhood as they found out it was where Robert Shaw died. Ben decided to stay outside as Marcus went in with his photographer issued hand gun. He found the Le Vaudou Mort and was rendered unconscious by someone. Outside, Mary's mother called Ben's cell phone informing him that Mary has not yet reached home. After the conversation, Ben spotted Kandi's car and found Jed's body with a slit on his mouth ear to ear. Ben went inside to warn Marcus only to be knocked out by Kandi, who was in fact the killer.

Kandi, who was actually Robert Shaw's daughter, wanted revenge on Ben's family. It is revealed that the man earlier was Robert Shaw, being killed by Samuel Rutherford (Ben and Marcus' father). She explained that she wanted Ben to feel what she felt when her father died for nothing, thus killing his friends first to prolong the agony. Marcus was unconscious on the floor and Mary was held captive. Ben was held at gunpoint. Kandi then began to put Mary's picture in the La Vaudou Mort and she began to poke her wax figure. Ben was able to stop Kandi from continuing but Kandi dragged Ben outside the house and planned to slash his throat with a knife. Mary freed herself and Marcus. Mary then cut Kandi's face in the picture and began to do the wax figure. As Kandi was about to kill Ben, holes appeared in her chest implying that Mary has successfully gave Kandi a taste of her own medicine. Kandi died as flashbacks of her friends' deaths go through her head. Marcus and Mary went out to Ben's aid.

One month later, Marcus and Ben finally made up and hung around on Marcus' boat from which he inherited from his father. They decided to throw the Le Vaudou Mort into the ocean so that no one will be victimized by it again.

Cast
Michael Dorman as Ben Rutherford
Travis Fimmel as Marcus Rutherford
Tahyna Tozzi as Mary
Jessica Marais as Kandi
Trilby Glover as Isabel
Chanel Marriott as Lucy
Khan Chittenden as Jed
Luke Carroll as Nelson
Nathaniel Buzolic as Ryan
Jane Badler as Professor Banyon
John Jarratt as Paul the Coroner
James Hagan as Samuel Rutherford
Ben Mendelsohn as Detective Meares
Malcolm Kennard as Detective Reddick
Murray Bartlett as Tony Martin
Quinton George as Mr Joshua
Caroline McKenzie as Eliza Shaw
Sam Longley as Basketball Coach
Igor Sas as Dr. Halmanay

Awards 
 Screamfest (2010) – Best Horror Make-up Effects
 British Horror Film Festival (2010) – Best Cinematography
 British Horror Film Festival (2010) – Best Special Effects (by MEG FX)
 British Horror Film Festival (2010) – Best Supporting Actress (Jessica Marais)
 Melbourne Underground Film Festival (2011) – Best Cinematography (Stephen Windon)
 Melbourne Underground Film Festival (2011) – Best Actor (Michael Dorman)
 Melbourne Underground Film Festival (2011) – Special Jury Prize (Needle, John V. Soto)
 Melbourne Underground Film Festival (2011) – Best Poster Artwork

References

External links 
 
 
 
Needle on Screen Australia

2010 films
2010s English-language films
Australian horror films
Films shot in Australia
Australian slasher films
Films directed by John V. Soto
2010s slasher films